Khurheh (also Romanized as Khūrheh, Khoorheh, and Khvorheh; also known as Khowrhen, Khūra, Khūrreh, and Kūrheh) is a village in Khurheh Rural District, in the Central District of Mahallat County, Markazi Province, Iran. At the 2006 census, its population was 627, in 224 families.

This site was first excavated by Naser al-Din Shah Qajar, on a treasure hunt. It also has an inscription on a rock that date to Seljuq Empire.

References 

Populated places in Mahallat County